Saint-Germain-en-Coglès (pronounced as Saint-Germain-en-Cogles) is a commune in the Ille-et-Vilaine department of Brittany in northwestern France.

Population
Inhabitants of Saint-Germain-en-Coglès are called germanais in French.

History
The parish is named after Germanus of Auxerre in the fifth century. In the twelfth century, it belonged to the abbey of Saint-Florent de Saumur before being united to the diocese of Rennes XIV. The present church retains some elements of Romanesque tombstones of the previous building. Bertrand Saulnier (twelfth century), Pierre Loupvelaye (1550), Isaac Lachesnais (1590), Leonard Tréhu (1613), Valentin Chevetel (1706) and Pierre Pougeolle (1779) were rectors of the paris

See also
Communes of the Ille-et-Vilaine department

References

External links

Mayors of Ille-et-Vilaine Association 

Communes of Ille-et-Vilaine